Files with the .erl filename extension may be:
 Erlang source code files
 nProtect GameGuard files